Matveyevskoye is a rural locality (a village) in Novlenskoye Rural Settlement, Vologodsky District, Vologda Oblast, Russia. The population was 14 as of 2002.

Geography 
The distance to Vologda is 84 km, to Novlenskoye is 24 km. Malgino is the nearest rural locality.

References 

Rural localities in Vologodsky District